WCEM may refer to:

 WCEM-FM, a radio station (106.3 FM) licensed to Cambridge, Maryland, United States
 WCEM (AM), a radio station (1240 AM) licensed to Cambridge, Maryland, United States
 Wainganga College of Engineering and Management, Wardha Road, Nagpur